The fifth USS Congress was a screw sloop in the United States Navy.

Service history 
Congress was launched by the Philadelphia Navy Yard on 17 July 1868, sponsored by the daughter of Senator Charles D. Drake of Missouri; and commissioned on 4 March 1870, Captain N. Harrison in command. The ship was variously known as Pushmataha, and Cambridge prior to 10 August 1869, when she was renamed Congress, the name under which she performed all her service.

Her initial cruise, undertaken in 1870, was as flagship for Commodore Joseph F. Green of the South Atlantic Squadron. Returning to Boston, Massachusetts, on 29 May 1871, she was placed under Commander Henry Kallock Davenport. Late in 1871, Congress served also as flagship for Vice Admiral Stephen Clegg Rowan who had been designated to accord suitable reception to a visiting Russian squadron.

After a cruise to Haiti in early 1872, Congress sailed from Norfolk, Virginia, on 14 February, to join the Mediterranean Squadron. This lengthy tour included visits to many ports of Europe and ended at Key West, Florida, where she arrived on 5 January 1874. She was back in the Mediterranean by 9 April, and visited ports on the coasts of Africa and Europe before returning to Philadelphia to visit the Centennial Exposition of 1876.

Congress was decommissioned on 26 July 1876, at Portsmouth, New Hampshire, and laid up in ordinary until 20 September 1883, when she was sold.

References 
 

Sloops of the United States Navy
Ships built in Philadelphia
1868 ships
Polaris expedition